The Art Institute of Pittsburgh was a private college in Pittsburgh, Pennsylvania.  Shortly before closing in 2019, it was purchased by Dream Center Education Holdings (in turn a division of The Dream Center, a  Christian non-profit 501(c)(3) organization in Los Angeles, California, established in 1994) It was located in Pittsburgh, Pennsylvania, and emphasized design education and career preparation for the creative job market. It was founded in 1921 and closed in 2019.

Ai-Pittsburgh was part of the system of Art Institutes which includes Ai-Online. The school shut its doors in March 2019 after being placed into federal receivership. At the time of its closure, Ai-Pittsburgh was facing removal of its accreditation by the Middle States Commission on Higher Education (MSCHE) due to concerns over the executive leadership.

According to the National Center for Education Statistics, the Art Institute of Pittsburgh had a 29 percent graduation rate and a 20.9 percent student loan default rate.

History 
Founded in 1921, the school began as a profit-based independent school of art and illustration, producing a number of notable artists including watercolorist Frank Webb, animation producer and director Rick Schneider-Calabash, and the late science fiction illustrator Frank Kelly Freas.  The Institute now specializes primarily in design disciplines and culinary arts. In 1968, Education Management Corporation (EDMC) acquired The Art Institute of Pittsburgh, and created additional schools the Art Institute system.

In 2008, it briefly became one of the largest arts colleges in the United States (factoring online enrollment). However, in 2010 enrollment began to drop, in part due to the falsification of records. Whistleblowers within the company sued the Institute due to practices at the online division,  and were later joined by the United States Department of Justice.

Since the 2009 public offering of EDMC, and the subsequent majority position by Goldman Sachs, emphasis throughout the EDMC system shifted increasingly toward shareholder profits with cost-cutting measures resulting in larger classes, fewer student services, and a standardized curriculum throughout the system.  This standardization removed the need for resident experts and curriculum developers at the individual colleges.

Enrollment in the online division and EDMC's other online programs ballooned from 7,900 in 2007 to 42,300 in 2012, due in large part to practices that devoted more per-student expenditures to marketing ($4,158) than on education ($3,460). Since then, however, dramatic drops in enrollment have led to massive layoffs in the online division.

In 2013, Payscale.com found that the institute provided the worst return on tuition of all institutes of higher learning surveyed. According to disclosures the college is required to provide to the Department of Education, the overall graduation rates fell to 39% in 2012, while graduation rates among Pell grant recipients were still lower at 27%. The graduation rate fell substantially further in 2014 from 39% to 24%. New owners took control of EDMC in 2015, as EDMC entered into a debt-for-equity swap with its current owners, giving up the majority of their stock to creditors with whom they broke loan covenants.

In 2017, Education Management Corporation reported that it had sold the existing Art Institutes to The Dream Center Foundation, a Los Angeles-based Pentecostal organization. The sale was complete in October 2017. Dream Center would later blame EDMC for providing inaccurate revenue and cost projections at the time of the sale, resulting in a substantial operating deficit that forced the Art Institute into federal receivership in January 2019.

In March 2019, after the collapse of a last-ditch effort to sell the school, the Art Institute of Pittsburgh announced it would permanently cease operations.

Location 
On March 27, 2017, The Art Institute of Pittsburgh moved to 1400 Penn Avenue in Pittsburgh. During its growth phase, it relocated several times, expanding and broadening the curriculum, but later reduced offerings during its contraction period. The school purchased a historic landmark building at 420 Boulevard of the Allies in 2000, but sold it to a Chicago developer in 2014. The Art Institute then moved to its more industrial building in the Strip District of Pittsburgh. In 2019, the Art Institute of Pittsburgh went out of business.

The Art Institute of Pittsburgh – Online Division 
The Art Institute of Pittsburgh's online division was a semi-autonomous division of the Art Institute. It offered degree programs and non-degree diploma courses in a variety of creative fields. The online division was shut down alongside the Strip campus location.

Licensing, accreditation and memberships 
The Art Institute of Pittsburgh was accredited by The Middle States Commission on Higher Education (since 2008).

Notable alumni 
The Art Institute of Pittsburgh has more than 55,000 alumni.

 Matt Bors, a nationally syndicated American editorial cartoonist and editor of online comics publication, The Nib.
 Shane Callahan, an American film and television actor.
 Julian Michael Carver, American sci-fi and horror novelist.
 Frank Kelly Freas, an American science fiction and fantasy artist with a career spanning more than 50 years. He was known as the "Dean of Science Fiction Artists" and he was the second artist inducted into the Science Fiction Hall of Fame.
 Paul Gulacy, an American comics artist who worked for both DC and Marvel Comics.  He is best known for drawing one of the first graphic novels, Eclipse Enterprises 1978 Sabre: Slow Fade of an Endangered Species, with writer Don McGregor. 
 Leon Levinstein, an American street photographer best known for his work documenting everyday street life in New York City from the 1950s through the 1980s.
 Garrett Mason, an American Republican politician.
 J. Howard Miller (1939), an American graphic artist who painted posters during World War II in support of the war effort, among them the famous "We Can Do It!" poster, frequently misidentified as Rosie the Riveter.
 John Prentice, an American cartoonist and comic-book artist most widely known for his work on the syndicated comic strip Rip Kirby. (Did not graduate.)
 Martha Rial, an independent photographer based in Pittsburgh. 1998 Pulitzer Prize winner for Spot News Photography, for her photographs of Rwandan and Burundian refugees.
 Jennifer M. Smith, former Premier of Bermuda 1998–2003; the first premier who was not a member of the United Bermuda Party.
 Roman Verostko (diploma in illustration, 1949), an American artist and educator who created code-generated imagery, known as algorithmic art. 
 Frank Webb (1946), an American watercolor painter.
 Tom Wilson (1955), American cartoonist and creator of the Ziggy comic strip.
 Rick Schneider-Calabash, award-winning animation producer, writer, director for Walt Disney Studios.

References

External links 

 

Art Institute of Pittsburgh, The
Pittsburgh
Universities and colleges in Pittsburgh
Pittsburgh History & Landmarks Foundation Historic Landmarks
1921 establishments in Pennsylvania
Arts organizations established in 1921
Educational institutions disestablished in 2019
Art in Pittsburgh